The BMW M60 is a naturally aspirated V8 petrol engine which was produced from 1992 to 1996. It was BMW's first V8 engine in over 25 years.

The M60 was replaced by the BMW M62 engine.

Development
During the 1970s, BMW produced a prototype V8 engine for the E23 7 Series, however this engine did not reach production.

Development of the M60 began in 1984.

Design
The M60 engine has double overhead camshafts with four valves per cylinder. The camshaft is driven by a dual-row timing chain with a self-adjusting tensioner. Valves had hydraulic lash adjustment to reduce maintenance. The ignition and fuel injection systems are controlled by the Bosch Motronic 3.3 system, and the ignition system is a coil-on-plug design with knock sensors.

To reduce weight, the engine uses aluminum for both the engine block and cylinder head, magnesium valve covers and a plastic intake manifold. The M60 was BMW's first car engine to use a "split conrod" design, where sintered connecting rods are made as a single piece and then fractured in order to ensure increased rigidity and an exact fit.

Versions

M60B30

Applications:
 1992–1995 E34 530i
 1992–1994 E32 730i
 1994–1996 E38 730i

M60B40
It had a forged crankshaft.

Applications:
 1993–1995 E34 540i
 1992–1994 E32 740i
 1994–1996 E38 740i
 1992–1996 E31 840i
 1993–1998 De Tomaso Guarà

Alpina versions 
Alpina produced a high compression (10.8:1) version of the M60B40 for the BMW Alpina B10 4.0 (based on the E34 5 Series) and the B11 4.0 (based on the E32 7 Series) and in some B8 4.0 models (based on the E36 3 Series) produced for the Japanese market. The M60 engine produced  in the B10 4.0.

Nikasil damage from high-sulfur fuels
The M60 uses Nikasil- an alloy containing aluminium, nickel and silicon alloy- to line the cylinders bores. In fuels with high sulfur content (such as used fuels sold at the time in the United States, United Kingdom and South America), the sulfur damages the Nikasil bore lining, causing the engine to lose compression. In the U.S. and U.K., sulfur rich fuel is being phased out.

BMW replaced engines under warranty and Nikasil was eventually replaced by Alusil.

Nikasil engines are unlikely to be a problem today, as cars with affected engines are off the road or have received replacement engines.

See also 
 BMW
 List of BMW engines

References

BMW engines
V8 engines
Gasoline engines by model